The 1955 Xavier Musketeers football team was an American football team that represented Xavier University as an independent during the 1955 college football season. In its first season under head coach Harry W. Connelly, the team compiled a 7–2 record and outscored opponents by a total of 196 to 72. The team played its home games at Xavier Stadium in Cincinnati.

Schedule

References

Xavier
Xavier Musketeers football seasons
Xavier Musketeers football